Colonel Frederick Gustavus Burnaby (3 March 1842 – 17 January 1885) was a British Army intelligence officer.  Burnaby's adventurous spirit, pioneering achievements, and swashbuckling courage earned an affection in the minds of Victorian imperial idealists. As well as travelling across Europe and Central Asia, he mastered ballooning, spoke a number of foreign languages fluently, stood for parliament twice, published several books, and was admired and feted by the women of London high society.  His popularity was legendary, appearing in a number of stories and tales of empire.

Early life 

Frederick Burnaby was born in Bedford, the son of the Rev. Gustavus Andrew Burnaby of Somerby Hall, Leicestershire, and canon of Middleham in Yorkshire (d. 15 July 1872), by Harriet, sister of Henry Villebois of Marham House, Norfolk (d. 1883).  His sister Mary married John Manners-Sutton. He was a first cousin of Edwyn Burnaby and of Louisa Cavendish-Bentinck. Fred was educated at Bedford School, Harrow, Oswestry School, where he was a contemporary of William Archibald Spooner, and in Germany. Legend has it he could carry two boys under both arms up the stairs of school house. Burnaby was a huge man for his times: 6 ft 4in tall and 20 stone when fully grown.  His outsize personality and strength became the literary legend of imperial might.  Lionised by the press for his outlandish expeditious adventures across Central Asia, Burnaby at 6 ft 4 ins tall with broad shoulders was a giant amongst men, symbolic of a Victorian celebrity, feted in London society.

He entered the Royal Horse Guards in 1859.  Finding no chance for active service, his spirit of adventure sought outlets in balloon ascents and in travels through Spain and Russia with his firm friend, George Radford.  In the summer of 1874 he accompanied the Carlist forces in Spain as correspondent for The Times, but before the end of the war he was transferred to Africa to report on Gordon's expedition to the Sudan.  This took Burnaby as far as Khartoum.

Military adventures 
Returning to England in March 1875, he formulated his plans for a journey on horseback to the Khanate of Khiva through Russian Asia, which had just been closed to travellers.  War had broken out between the Russian army and the Turcoman tribesmen of the desert.  He planned to visit St. Petersburg to meet Count Milyutin, the Minister of War to the Tsar.  Travelling at his own expense carrying an 85 lb pack, he departed London Victoria station on 30 November 1875.  The Russians announced they would protect the soldier along the route, but to all intents and purposes this proved impossible.  The accomplishment of this task, in the winter of 1875–1876, with the aim of reciprocity for India and the Tsarist State, was described in his book A Ride to Khiva, and brought him immediate fame.  The city of Merv was inaccessible, but presented a potential military flashpoint.  The Russians knew that British Intelligence gathered information along the frontier.  Similar expeditions had taken place under Captain George Napier (1874) and Colonel Charles MacGregor (1875).  By Christmas, Burnaby had arrived at Orenburg.  In receipt of orders prohibiting progress into Persia from Russian-held territory, he was warned not to advance.  A fluent Russian speaker, he was not coerced; arriving at a Russian garrison, the officers entertaining the former Khan of Kokand.

Hiring a servant and horses his party trudged through the snow to Kazala, intending a crossing into Afghanistan from Merv. Extreme winter blizzards brought frostbite, treated with "naphtha", a Cossack emetic.  Close to death, Burnaby took three weeks to recover.  Having received conflicted accounts of the dubious privilege of Russian hospitality it was a welcome release, he later told his book, to be cheered with vodka.  It was another 400 miles south to Khiva, when he was requested to divert to Petro Alexandrovsk, a Russian fortress garrison.  Lurid tales of wild tribesmen awaiting his desert travails ready to "gouge out his eyes" were intended to discourage.  He ignored the escort, believing the tribes more friendly than the Russians.  Intending to go via Bokhara and Merv, he deviated, cutting two days off the journey.  Leaving Kazala on 12 January 1876 with a servant, guide, three camels and a kibitka, Burnaby bribed the servant with 100 Roubles a day to avoid the fortress where he would be bound to be delayed.  A local mullah wrote an introduction note to the Khan, and clad in furs they traversed the freezing desert.  On the banks of River, 60 miles from the capital, he was met by the Khan's nobleman, who guided the escort into the city.  Burnaby's book outlined in some detail the events of the following days, the successful outcome of the meetings, and the decision he took to evade the Russian army.  The Khanate was already at war, his possessions seized; the Russians intended a march from Tashkent to seize Kashgar, Merv and Herat.  Protestations of neutrality were a sham.  Burnaby gained respect from the population, who bowed in homage at a soldier en passant.  But on return to his quarters he received a note of orders from Horse Guards to return via Russia.  Frustrated Burnaby learnt of the overwhelming numerical superiority the Tsarists presented.  To his great surprise he was received as a brother officer at Petro Alexandrovsk.  Colonel Ivanov was smug and proud declared the fate of Merv "must be decided by the sword." Released by the Khan's Treasurer he travelled for nine days with Cossacks across the snowy plains of Kazala.  Hard-bitten and hungry he sat on a small pony for 900 miles.  En route he heard of what later was described in parliament as the Bulgarian Horrors, and a forthcoming campaign against Yakub Beg in Kashgaria.

On arrival back in England, March 1876, he was received by Commander-in-Chief, Prince George, Duke of Cambridge, whose praise marvelled at Burnaby's feats of derring-do and impressive physique.  Burnaby's fame grew celebrated in London society, in newspaper and magazines.  His guest appearances flattered to deceive, when he learnt that he had travelled with the ringleaders of the Cossack Revolt.  The rising of the Eastern Question in parliament was sparked in a village in Hercegovina and spread to Bosnia, Serbia, Montenegro and Bulgaria. Outraged by the pogroms the Prime Minister ordered immediate diplomatic efforts, while W. E. Gladstone demanded an aggressive clear out of the Sultanate from Europe.  It was in the crucible of this crisis that Burnaby planned a second expedition.  At Constantinople he had planned to meet Count Ignatiev, the Russian ambassador, whom he missed on his journey across Turkey on horseback, through Asia Minor, from Scutari to Erzerum, with the object of observing the Russian frontier, an account of which he afterwards published.  He was warned the Russian garrison had issued an arrest warrant; turning back at the frontier he took ship on the Black Sea via the Bosphorus and the Mediterranean.  In April 1877 Russia declared war on Turkey. The inexorable conclusion was drawn in Calcutta and London that Russia would not avoid, but wanted war; planning more attacks still.  Eager for Russian rule, Colonel N L Grodekov had built a road from Tashkent to Herat via Samarkand, anticipating a war of conquest. Burnaby's warnings that the bellicose Russians posed a serious threat to India were confirmed later by Lord Curzon, and an expedition much later under the arabist Colonel Francis Younghusband, witnessed by the genesis of a Cossack invasion.

See main article: Russo-Turkish War of 1877

Burnaby (who soon afterwards became lieutenant-colonel) acted as travelling agent to the Stafford House Red Cross Committee, but had to return to England before the campaign was over.

In 1879 he married Elizabeth Hawkins-Whitshed, who had inherited her father's lands at Greystones, Ireland.  The previously-named Hawkins-Whitshed estate at Greystones is known as The Burnaby to this day. At this point began his active interest in politics, and in 1880 he unsuccessfully contested Birmingham in the Tory-Democrat interest, which was followed by a second attempt in 1885.

On 23 March 1882 he crossed the English Channel in a gas balloon. Having been disappointed in his hope of seeing active service in the Egyptian Campaign of 1882, he participated in the Suakin campaign of 1884 without official leave, and was wounded at El Teb when acting as an intelligence officer for his friend General Valentine Baker.

Death 
The aforementioned events did not deter Burnaby from a similar course when a fresh expedition started up the Nile. He was given a post by Lord Wolseley, involved first in the skirmish at El Teb, until he met his death in the hand-to-hand fighting of the Battle of Abu Klea. As a gap in the lines opened up the Colonel rushed out to rescue a colleague and was wounded outside the square. Corporal Mackintosh went to his rescue driving his bayonet into the assailant. Lieutenant-Colonel Lord Binning rushed out to give him some water, twice. On the last occasion he came across a private crying, holding the dying man's head. He had been struck again by a Mahdist spear through the neck and throat. The young soldier was tearful because Burnaby was revered as one of the great Victorian heroes. A courageous man of charm and supreme self-sacrifice, who was admired and respected in equal measure. Lord Binning recalled "that in our little force his death caused a feeling akin to consternation.  In my own detachment many of the men sat down and cried".  Private Steele who went to help him won the Distinguished Conduct Medal. There are two memorials erected to his memory in Holy Trinity Garrison and Parish Church in Windsor, the first by the officers and men of the Royal Horse Guards and the second, a privately funded memorial from Edward, Prince of Wales.

Cultural references 
Henry Newbolt's poem "Vitaï Lampada" is often quoted as referring to Burnaby's death at Abu Klea; "The Gatling's jammed and the Colonel's dead...", (although it was a Gardner machine gun which jammed). It was, perhaps, because of an impromptu order by Burnaby (who, as a supernumerary, had no official capacity in the battle) that the Dervishes managed to get inside the square. Yet the song "Colonel Burnaby" was written in his honour and his portrait hangs in the National Portrait Gallery, London. There are two contradictory accounts:

 The report in The Times, says that Burnaby fell while re-forming a broken British square, this being one of only two recorded cases of a British square breaking in the 19th century.
 Another account says that the square did not break, but men were ordered to pull aside temporarily to let the Gardner gun and then the Heavy Camel Corps get out and attack the enemy. Some Dervishes got inside before the gap closed, but the back ranks of the square faced-about and made an end of the intruders.

Burnaby's Ride to Khiva appears in Joseph Conrad's 1898 short story, "Youth," when the young Marlow recounts how he "read for the first time Sartor Resartus and Burnaby's Ride to Khiva," preferring "the soldier to the philosopher at the time."

Burnaby appears as a balloonist in Julian Barnes's memoir Levels of Life (2014), where he is portrayed as having a (fictional) love affair with Sarah Bernhardt.

It has been suggested that Burnaby may have been (in part) an inspiration for the creation of George MacDonald Fraser's fictional anti-hero Harry Flashman.

Works 
 Practical Instruction of Staff Officers in Foreign Armies, published 1872
 A Ride to Khiva: Travels and Adventures in Central Asia (1876)  
 On Horseback Through Asia Minor (1877) 
(both with an introduction by Peter Hopkirk)
 A Ride across the Channel, published 1882
 Our Radicals: a tale of love and politics, published 1886
Journals
 Regular contributions as roving correspondent to The Times in Egypt and the Sudan
 Vanity Fair
 Punch from 1872 onwards.
Letters
 edited by Dr. John W. Hawkins, Fred: The Collected Letters and Speeches of Colonel Frederick Gustavus Burnaby. Vol. 1 1842-1878 (Helion & Co., 2013)
 ed. Dr. John W. Hawkins, Fred: The Collected Letters and Speeches of Colonel Frederick Gustavus Burnaby. Vol. 2 1878-1885 (Helion & Co., 2014)

Legacy 

A tall Portland stone obelisk in the churchyard of St Philip's Cathedral, Birmingham commemorates his life. Besides Burnaby's bust, in relief, it carries only the word "Burnaby", and the dated place names "Khiva 1875" and "Abu Klea 1885". The obelisk was unveiled by Lord Charles Beresford on 13 November 1885.

There is a memorial window to Burnaby at St Peter's Church, Bedford. There is also a public house, The Burnaby Arms, located in the Black Tom area of Bedford.  The organ at Oswestry School Chapel was given in his memory.

William Kinnard, who was instrumental in acquiring a post office for a tiny settlement at the base of Morgan's Point on Lake Erie's North Shore in Ontario, Canada, "suggested the name Burnaby after an article he had read in The Globe" newspaper about a Colonel who had been killed in the Egyptian War.

Notes

References

Bibliography

Secondary sources
(Andrew, Sir William ?) "An Indian Officer", Russia's March towards India, 1894

 Chapter 10 - "Fred Burnaby: The Gentle Giant"

External links 
  — biography of a Frederick Burnaby

1842 births
1885 deaths
Military personnel from Bedford
People from Bedford
People from the Borough of Melton
People educated at Harrow School
Royal Horse Guards officers
English travel writers
British military personnel killed in the Mahdist War
People educated at Oswestry School
Greystones
Great Game
People educated at Bedford School
Travelers in Asia Minor